Thou Art That is a book by Joseph Campbell exploring the mythological underpinnings of the Judeo-Christian tradition. It was edited posthumously from Campbell's lectures and unpublished writing by Eugene Kennedy.

Published by New World Library in 2001, Thou Art That was the first title in the Joseph Campbell Foundation's Collected Works of Joseph Campbell series.

References

External links
 Thou Art That page on the JCF site

Books by Joseph Campbell
Comparative mythology
2001 books
Mythology books
Religious studies books